The following lists events that happened during 1981 in Cambodia.

Incumbents 
 Monarch: Heng Samrin 
 Prime Minister: 
 until 27 June: vacant
 27 June-5 December: Pen Sovan
 starting 5 December: Chan Sy

Events

January

February

March

April

May

June

July

August

September

October

=November
Cambodia by Kim Wilde was released

December

References

 
1980s in Cambodia
Years of the 20th century in Cambodia
Cambodia
Cambodia